Growing Up Fisher is an  American sitcom that began airing mid-season on NBC as part of the 2013–14 United States network television schedule. The semi-autobiographical single camera series was created by D. J. Nash.

On January 10, 2014, NBC announced that Growing Up Fisher would premiere following the 2014 Olympics on Sunday, February 23, 2014, at 10:30 pm, and then move to its regular timeslot on Tuesday, March 4, at 9:30 pm following About a Boy.

On May 9, 2014, NBC canceled Growing Up Fisher after one season.

Plot
The family of 11-year-old Henry (Eli Baker) begins to function after the divorce of blind father and lawyer Mel (J.K. Simmons) and mother Joyce (Jenna Elfman). The series follows everyday situations the family goes through, often involving Henry's sister Katie (Ava Deluca-Verley) and normal situations the parents handle, usually in a comical way.

Cast

Main
J. K. Simmons as Mel Fisher
Eli Baker as Henry Fisher
Ava Deluca-Verley as Katie Fisher
Lance Lim as Runyen
Jenna Elfman as Joyce Fisher
Jason Bateman (voice only) as Future Henry Fisher

Recurring
Isabela Moner as Jenny
Matthew Glave as Principal Sloan
Carla Jimenez as Janice

Development and production
The series first appeared on the development slate at NBC in October 2012 under the title ...Then Came Elvis. The network placed a pilot order in January 2013.  The pilot episode was written by D. J. Nash, and directed by David Schwimmer.

Casting announcements began in February 2013, with Parker Posey first cast in the role of Joyce Fisher, Henry's mother who attempts to reclaim her youth, post-divorce. J.K. Simmons was the second actor cast, in the series regular role of the blind family patriarch, Mel Fisher. Shortly after, Eli Baker and Ava Deluca-Verley were then added to the cast, with Baker cast in the lead role of Henry Fisher and Deluca-Verley to the role of Katie Fisher, Henry's older sister, who Joyce desperately wants to be close to.

In May 2013, NBC placed a series order for the comedy under the new title The Family Guide, and in June, it underwent another name change to Growing Up Fisher. In July 2013, Jenna Elfman replaced Parker Posey in the role of Joyce Fisher.

Episodes

Reception and cancellation
Initially sporting good ratings, viewership declined over the course of the season, ending with a 1.2 share (about five million viewers) when the show was cancelled. Only 2 of NBC's 8 sitcoms were renewed that year. It was unpopular with critics, producing a 35% critic rating on Rotten Tomatoes, although audiences loved it twice as much, producing a 70%.

References

External links

2010s American single-camera sitcoms
2014 American television series debuts
2014 American television series endings
Television shows set in Los Angeles
Television series by Universal Television
English-language television shows
NBC original programming